Air Commodore Anthony Norman Davis,  (14 August 1918 – 1988) was a Royal Air Force officer who served as a pilot during the Second World War.

Early life and career
Born in the Farnham area of Surrey, Davis was the son of Lieutenant Colonel H. J. N. Davis. He graduated from the Royal Military Academy, Woolwich as a second lieutenant in the Royal Engineers of the British Army. In 1940, he transferred to the Royal Air Force (RAF) as a pilot.

RAF career
Davis served in the Second World War. He was awarded the Distinguished Flying Cross as a flight lieutenant in 1943, and received the Distinguished Service Order (DSO) as an acting squadron leader in 1945. The citation for his DSO was published in the London Gazette of 24 July 1945, reading:

When Davis announced his engagement to Dominique Gauquié in 1950 he was the air attache in Budapest. In 1963, he was promoted air commodore as the air attache in Moscow.

Davis appeared on British television in the 1970s as the Ministry of Defence spokesman on Unidentified Flying Objects.

His grandson is the Franco-British actor Edward Akrout.

References

1918 births
1988 deaths
Companions of the Distinguished Service Order
Recipients of the Distinguished Flying Cross (United Kingdom)
Royal Air Force air commodores
Royal Air Force pilots of World War II
Royal Engineers officers
Graduates of the Royal Military Academy, Woolwich
People from the Borough of Waverley